{
  "type": "FeatureCollection",
  "features": [
    {
      "type": "Feature",
      "properties": {},
      "geometry": {
        "type": "Point",
        "coordinates": [
          -81.40547275543213,
          43.91706205649324
        ]
      }
    }
  ]
}Whitechurch is a small residential village located in south-western Ontario.

Location 
Whitechurch is located along the border of Huron and Bruce County.  It is approximately 10 km west of Wingham, and 8 km east of Lucknow. The coordinates to Whitechurch are 43°55'01.9"N 81°24'20.6"W.

History 
Originally named Ulster, the name was changed when surveying for the former Ontario Highway 86, now Huron/Bruce County Road 86.

Churches 
The Whitechurch United Church closed on June 24, 2007.

The Whitechurch Presbyterian Church closed in the summer of 2016.

The Whitechurch Amish Mennonite Church was established in 1999 as a daughter congregation of the Cedar Grove Amish Mennonite Church. In 2018 the church had 35 members and was a member of the Maranatha Amish Mennonite Churches. The ministerial team included Bishop Larry Ropp, Minister Charles Jantzi, and Deacon Jeffrey Kuepfer.

Points of Interest 
The following points of interest are located within village limits.

 Whitechurch Community Hall
 Whitechurch Community Park
 Whitechurch Community Baseball Park

References

Communities in Huron County, Ontario